The 2022–23 A-League Women, known as the Liberty A-League for sponsorship reasons, is the fifteenth season of the A-League Women, the Australian national women's soccer competition.

Western United were announced as an expansion club, taking the total number of teams to 11.

Sydney FC are the defending premiers and Melbourne Victory are the defending champions.

Clubs

Stadiums and locations

Personnel and kits

Managerial changes

Transfers

Foreign players

Regular season

League table

Matches
The draw for the season was released on 15 September 2022.
All times are in AEDT (UTC+11:00) until 1 April 2023, AEST (UTC+10:00) afterwards.

Round 1

Round 2

Round 3

Round 4

Round 5

Round 6

Round 7

Round 8

Round 9

Round 10

Round 11

Round 12

Round 13

Round 14

Round 15

Round 16

Round 17

Round 18

Round 19

Round 20

Finals series
The top four teams in the regular season then advance to the single-game knockout semi-finals, with the champions determined by the victor of the Grand Final.

On 12 December 2022, the Australian Professional Leagues announced that the grand final would be hosted in Sydney, a move which received considerable backlash.

Grand Final

Regular season statistics

Top scorers

Hat-tricks

Notes
(H) – Home team
(A) – Away team

Clean sheets

See also

2022–23 A-League Men
A-League Women transfers for 2022–23 season
2022–23 Adelaide United FC (A-League Women) season
2022–23 Brisbane Roar FC (A-League Women) season
2022–23 Canberra United FC (A-League Women) season
2022–23 Melbourne City FC (A-League Women) season
2022–23 Melbourne Victory FC (A-League Women) season
2022–23 Newcastle Jets FC (A-League Women) season
2022–23 Perth Glory FC (A-League Women) season
2022–23 Sydney FC (A-League Women) season  
2022–23 Wellington Phoenix FC (A-League Women) season 
2022–23 Western Sydney Wanderers FC (A-League Women) season
2022–23 Western United FC (A-League Women) season

Notes

References

Australia
2022–23
2022–23 in Australian women's soccer
2022–23 A-League Women
A-League Women